The coat of arms of the Republic of South Sudan was adopted in July 2011 following independence from the Republic of Sudan. Prior to independence, South Sudan was an autonomous region of Sudan.

The design of the coat of arms was approved by the cabinet of the autonomous Government of Southern Sudan in April 2011, having previously been endorsed by the Southern Sudan Legislative Assembly in May 2011.

Design

The arms consist of an escutcheon with the tincture or (gold). The supporter is an African fish eagle holding a crossed spear and spade, symbolizing the people's resolve to protect the sovereignty of their republic and work hard to feed it, described in some press accounts as a shield and two spears. The eagle is depicted as looking towards its right shoulder with wings outstretched, and it holds in its claws a scroll bearing the name of the state. The eagle signifies strength, resilience, vision, and majesty.

History

Southern Sudan Autonomous Region (2005–2011)
The Southern Sudan Autonomous Region, that existed between 2005 and 2011, used an emblem consisting of the coat of arms of Sudan surrounded by the legends "GOVERNMENT OF SOUTHERN SUDAN" and "GOSS". The arms of Sudan depict a secretarybird bearing a traditional shield. Two scrolls are placed on the arms; the upper one displays the national motto, 'OUR VICTORY', and the lower one displays the title of the state, 'REPUBLIC OF THE SUDAN' in the English language.

Another emblem was also used by some agencies and offices of the autonomous Government of Southern Sudan. This coat of arms was similar to the arms of neighbouring Commonwealth states Kenya and Uganda. It depicted a traditional African shield with the design of the Flag of Southern Sudan, crossed by lances. The shield was supported by a shoebill and a rhinoceros. The compartment depicted local crops and the waters of the River Nile with a scroll bearing the motto "JUSTICE, EQUALITY, DIGNITY".

Sub-national emblems
Some of the states and areas of South Sudan have adopted seals or emblems for official purposes.

States

Administrative areas

Municipalities

See also

 Flag of South Sudan
 National anthem of South Sudan

References

External links

Sudan
National symbols of South Sudan
South Sudan
South Sudan
South Sudan
South Sudan
South Sudan